Lambula pleuroptycha is a moth of the family Erebidae. It was described by Alfred Jefferis Turner in 1940. It is found in Australia, where it has been recorded from the Northern Territory, Queensland and New South Wales.

The wingspan is about 20 mm.

References

Lithosiina
Moths described in 1940